Just You and Me, Kid is a 1979 American comedy film starring George Burns, Brooke Shields,  Lorraine Gary, Ray Bolger, Leon Ames, Carl Ballantine, Keye Luke and Burl Ives. It was directed by Leonard B. Stern and was released in July 1979 by Columbia Pictures.

Plot
Bill (George Burns) is an elderly ex-vaudevillian who lives alone, often looking at photographs of his deceased wife. Each day after breakfast, he goes to the supermarket, where he interacts in a friendly way with employees, often charming them with a magic trick.

Kate (Brooke Shields) is a teen-age girl who gets in a squabble with an intimidating man named Demesta (William Russ). The girl, who is wrapped in a towel and apparently otherwise nude, has locked herself in a bathroom to evade Demesta. He pounds on the door and demands to know the details of a drug deal that Kate has fouled up. Kate escapes through the window, wearing only the towel, while a police officer knocks on the door of the apartment and grapples with Demesta. Demesta is chased down the street while Kate goes in a different direction. She slips down a hillside staircase, losing the towel in the process.

Bill comes out of the grocery store, talking to the bag boy about magic tricks, and opens the trunk of his Pierce Arrow. They both see Kate, lying naked in the trunk. Stunned, Bill convinces the bag boy that it was just an illusion and drives away. Stopping on a secluded street, he confronts Kate, who asks him to take her to his house. He reluctantly agrees.

Bill asks Kate what's going on but she refuses to answer. He allows her to take shelter in his home and loans  her some of his clothes. Kate attempts to escape by dropping out of a window, spraining her ankle in the process. This attracts the attention of Bill's nosy neighbors, Stan (John Schuck) and Sue (Andrea Howard).

Next, Bill goes to see his friend Max (Burl Ives), in a nursing home. Max, another ex-vaudevillian and a former roommate, is despondent and non-verbal. Bill visits him daily, cheerfully describing his daily activities. Today, he tells Max about Kate. Later, Bill is confronted by his daughter, Shirl (Lorraine Gary) and her husband, Harris (Nicolas Coster). Shirl feels that Bill is senile and tries to get power of attorney of  his bank account. Bill refuses and Shirl becomes furious.

Meanwhile, Demesta is still in a rage. He intimidates Kate's friend, Roy (Christopher Knight), and vows to find Kate, implying that he will harm her.

Stan and Sue step up their meddling, calling Shirl about Kate. Shirl returns, demands to see Kate, and is put off by Bill again, who denies harboring a juvenile.

Kate finally confesses to Bill that she is on the run from a drug dealer. She claims that Demesta gave her money to make a connection but that she threw the cache into the sewer in a moment of panic. Bill advises her to go to the police but Kate is afraid to do so.

That night, Bill's poker buddies arrive and he introduces them to Kate. The evening is interrupted when Shirl returns with two police officers. Kate is concealed with a levitation magic trick and Shirl becomes more furious.

The next day, before Bill leaves to visit Max, Kate relates the story of a boy she once knew who also refused to talk and how the boy started talking once all the other kids ignored him. During the visit, Bill tells Max that he will never come to see him again unless Max talks. Max breaks down and begs Bill not to leave. Bill returns home to find Kate gone and becomes despondent.

Meanwhile, Kate returns to her foster home, collects her belongings, and meets Roy at school. Kate reveals that she never made the connection and still has the $20,000 in cash. Shocked, Roy tells her that Demesta will kill her. She says she plans to leave town with the money. When Roy tells her that Demesta knows where she has been hiding, she becomes concerned about Bill.

After she returns to Bill's house, Demesta forces his way in and a chase ensues. Bill holds Demesta at bay with a sword and incapacitates him. The police are summoned and Demesta is arrested. Shirl arrives and Bill  asks her for a favor.

Max packs his belongings, preparing to go back home with Bill, when he learns that Shirl and Harris have agreed to act as foster parents for Kate.  Bill explains that Kate will stay with him and Max on the week-ends. The film ends with the threesome departing together.

Cast
George Burns as Bill Grant
Brooke Shields as Kate
Lorraine Gary as Shirley
Ray Bolger as Tom
Leon Ames as Manduke the Magnificent
Carl Ballantine as Reinholf the Remarkable
Keye Luke as Doctor Device
Burl Ives as Max Wellington
John Schuck as Stan Waterman
Nicolas Coster as Harris
Andrea Howard as Sue Waterman
William Russ as John Demesta
Christopher Knight as Roy
Julie Cobb as Dr. Nancy Faulkner
Peter Brandon as Woodrow
Jacque Lynn Colton as Edna
Robert Doran as Joseph (Box Boy)
Ben Frank as First Policeman
Arthur Rosenberg as Pharmacist
Roger Price as Mailman
Tom Leopold as Policeman
Patrick Cronin as Doctor
Kate Stern as Student
Levin Bailey as Student
Robert Phalen as Foster Father

Home media
In 2014, the film was released on DVD by Sony Pictures Home Entertainment., and was released to streaming in HD via various providers in 2022. However, as of 2022, the film has not been released on Blu-ray.

References

External links

1979 films
Columbia Pictures films
1970s English-language films
1979 comedy films
American comedy films
Films scored by Jack Elliott
1970s American films